Stimulation is an album by jazz organist Johnny "Hammond" Smith recorded for the Prestige label in 1961.

Track listing
All compositions by Johnny "Hammond" Smith except where noted.
 "Sticks and Stones" (Titus Turner) – 4:32
 "Because You Left Me" – 5:29
 "Ribs an' Chips" – 8:00
 "Cry Me a River" (Arthur Hamilton) – 4:41
 "Que Pasa?" – 3:53
 "Invitation" (Bronisław Kaper) – 3:06
 "Spring Is Here" (Lorenz Hart, Richard Rodgers) – 4:18
 "Stimulation" – 2:56
Recorded at Van Gelder Studio in Englewood Cliffs, New Jersey on February 14 (tracks 3, 4, 6 & 7) and May 12 (tracks 1, 2, 5 & 8), 1961.

Personnel
Johnny "Hammond" Smith – organ
Freddie McCoy – vibraphone
Eddie McFadden – guitar
Wendell Marshall – bass
Leo Stevens – drums
 Esmond Edwards – producer
 Rudy Van Gelder – engineer

References

Johnny "Hammond" Smith albums
1961 albums
Prestige Records albums
Albums produced by Esmond Edwards
Albums recorded at Van Gelder Studio